The following is a list of Air Force Falcons football players who have been selected in the National Football League Draft. As of the 2022 NFL Draft, the Falcons have had nine players picked by NFL teams, four of whom have played in a professional game.

Until recently,  the United States Air Force Academy required its cadets to serve in the Air Force upon graduating, and historically NFL teams have avoided selecting players from the school outside of the later rounds. For example, kicker Dave Lawson fell as far back as the 16th round in the 1976 NFL Draft to the New York Giants; he briefly spent the 1977 preseason with the team via 23-day leave before being released. In 1988, Dallas Cowboys general manager Tex Schramm described selecting service academy players as "just a gamble you take." In the 1992 draft, the Houston Oilers selected Falcon kicker Joe Wood in the 12th round, with head coach Jack Pardee noting it was "no sure thing with Wood" in regards to his service; Wood signed with the Oilers after being assigned to nearby Ellington Field Joint Reserve Base, but a reassignment to Nellis Air Force Base in Nevada ended his hopes of playing for Houston. Graduates from the United States service academies are mandated to serve at least five years on active duty, though they can petition to move to reserve status after two years; Air Force linebacker Steve Russ used such a request to join the Denver Broncos in 1997 after being selected by them in the 1995 NFL Draft.

Wide receiver Ernie Jennings was selected by the San Francisco 49ers in the tenth round of the 1971 draft, but had to serve four years before he could join the team; he was cut without playing a game with the 49ers. In 1988, defensive tackle Chad Hennings was seen as a potential first-round pick if it was not for his military obligations, which dropped him to the Cowboys in the 11th round; after serving in the Gulf War, he went on to win three Super Bowls with the Cowboys. Another Falcon who enjoyed NFL success was defensive end Bryce Fisher, who was picked by the Buffalo Bills in the seventh round of the 1999 draft; he fulfilled his obligations at Pope Field before joining the Bills, and later played in Super Bowl XL with the Seattle Seahawks.

The most recent Air Force player to be selected is Defensive Tackle Jordan Jackson by the New Orleans Saints. He was drafted in 2022 (sixth round).

Key

Selections

References

Air Force Falcons

Air Force Falcons NFL Draft